Noah James Shebib (born March 31, 1983), better known as 40, is a Canadian record producer, songwriter, record executive, and former child actor from Toronto, Ontario. He is best known for his musical collaborations with Canadian rapper Drake and has produced all of his albums. Shebib's style of production, which is often downtempo and ambient, has become heavily associated with Drake's music.

Shebib and Drake are two of the three co-founders of the OVO Sound label. Shebib has won two Grammy Awards out of 18 nominations he has received and has also produced for artists including Lil Wayne, Alicia Keys, Beyoncé, Action Bronson, and Jamie Foxx.

Early life
Noah James Shebib is the son of Lebanese Canadian film director Donald Shebib and actress Tedde Moore, who is known for appearing in the 1983 film A Christmas Story; she was pregnant with him during the production of that film. On his mother's side, he is the grandson of actor and educator Mavor Moore, the great-grandson of Canadian theatre figure Dora Mavor Moore, and the great-great-grandson of Scottish-born economist James Mavor. His father is of partial Irish descent. He has three older sisters, Zoe, Suzanna, and Chaunce. As a child he attended school at Royal St. George's College and Humberside Collegiate Institute.

Acting career
Shebib began as a child actor, playing roles in television shows and films. His first role was in the 1996 "Go Eat Worms" episode of the Goosebumps television series.  He also played a consistent role on the Gemini Award-winning television series, Wind at My Back. His best-known role came in his teen years, when he was featured as one of the lead males in the critically acclaimed The Virgin Suicides. He also had smaller roles in The Last Don and Perfect Pie; the latter was his last movie before he retired from acting.

Music career
Early in Noah's career, before he started crafting beats, he DJ'd under the name DJ Chilly and performed alongside MC Elite (Everett MacLean). Shebib eventually made the shift from DJ to music producer, working with local Toronto artists like Empire, Knamelis, Stolenowners, and Christopher Morales, and Saukrates. He earned the nickname "40 Days & 40 Nights" (which was later reduced to "40") early on in his career, as he would work in the studio throughout the night, with no sleep.

He began working with then Degrassi star Aubrey Graham (Drake) in 2005. He was shown producing with Drake on Degrassi Unscripted. When Shebib first started working with Drake, he was originally just a recording  and mixing engineer, providing no songwriting or production input at all. However, after the third day of work, Shebib decided to build an exclusive relationship with Drake, proclaiming that they were "going to take over the world together."

Shebib's big break came in 2009, when he executive produced Drake's mixtape So Far Gone with Toronto-based producer, Boi-1da. He recorded and mixed every song off the mixtape, and also produced a few notable tracks such as "The Calm", "Houstatlantavegas", "Bria's Interlude" and "Successful", all of which ended up defining Drake's sound going forward. He also worked on Drake's debut album Thank Me Later, and second album Take Care.  On the latter, Shebib co produced almost every song, alongside his usual duties of recording and mixing the entire album. Shebib also produced the song "I'm Single" from Lil Wayne's "No Ceilings" mixtape, "Un-Thinkable (I'm Ready)" for Alicia Keys and "Demonstrate" for JoJo.

Shebib, along with Drake and Oliver El-Khatib, founded the OVO record label in 2012. Music produced under the imprint is uploaded to the label's blog site for streaming, before the album is officially released. One example is the single "Marvins Room", which was first posted to the blog site five days after its conception, before it was even slated to be a single off the album. Recently Shebib has helped produce Drake's newer material, co producing the lead single "Started from the Bottom", among other records.

Shebib also worked on Drake's third album, Nothing Was the Same, his fourth studio album Views, and Scorpion.

Production style
Shebib has been instrumental in creating Drake's music, and together their "atmospheric, brooding sound has shaped the landscape of hip hop moving forward." Shebib's production is described as "sparse, ambient, slow-jam-like tracks dominated by brooding synths, minimalist piano or guitar parts, stripped-down, often muffled drums, and cinematic atmospheric treatments." An example is the song "Marvins Room", where Shebib mixed the record so that it is "very dark and quiet and muddy and with the vocals cutting through like a razor" and is notorious for being heavy on the low end.

Personal life
In 2005, at the age of 22, Shebib was diagnosed with multiple sclerosis. His personal story is prominently featured on the National Multiple Sclerosis Society website, where he outlines his experiences with the disease, hoping that by creating awareness and "improving connections and knowledge about MS, we can end the disease". His mother was also diagnosed with multiple sclerosis.  He was awarded an honorary Doctorate of Laws (LLD) from York University on October 12, 2022. Shebib has expressed public support for Palestine.

Discography

Singles produced

Awards and nominations

Grammy Awards
The Grammy Awards are awarded annually by the National Academy of Recording Arts and Sciences.

|-
|rowspan="1"|2011
|Thank Me Later
|Best Rap Album
| 
|-
||2012
|Loud 
|Album of the Year
|
|-
|rowspan="2"|2013
|Take Care 
|Best Rap Album
|
|-
|"The Motto" 
|rowspan="3"|Best Rap Song
|
|-
|rowspan="3"|2014
|"Started from the Bottom" 
|
|-
|"Fuckin' Problems (Explicit)" 
|
|-
|Nothing Was the Same
|Best Rap Album 
| 
|-
|rowspan="2"|2015 
|"0 to 100 / The Catch Up"
|Best Rap Song 
|
|-
|Beyoncé 
|Album of the Year
|
|-
|rowspan="1"|2015
|If You're Reading This It's Too Late
|Best Rap Album
| 
|-
|rowspan="3"|2017 
|Views
|Album of the Year 
|
|-
|"Work"  
|Record of the Year
|
|-
|"Come and See Me" 
|Best R&B Song
|
|-
|rowspan="4"|2019 
|Scorpion 
|Album of the Year
|
|-
|rowspan="3"|"God's Plan" 
|Record of the Year
|
|-
|Song of the Year
|
|-
|Best Rap Song
|
|-
|2020
|"No Guidance" 
|Best R&B Song
| 
|-

References

1983 births
Canadian hip hop record producers
Canadian male child actors
Canadian male television actors
Canadian people of British descent
Canadian people of Irish descent
Canadian people of Lebanese descent
Canadian people of Scottish descent
Canadian people of Swiss descent
Grammy Award winners
Living people
Male actors from Toronto
Musicians from Toronto
OVO Sound artists
People with multiple sclerosis
Academy of Art University alumni